Paraibuna is a municipality in the state of São Paulo, Brazil.

Paraibuna may also refer to:
 Paraibuna River (São Paulo), a tributary of the Paraiba do Sul in the state of São Paulo, Brazil
 Paraibuna River (Minas Gerais), another tributary of the Paraiba do Sul in the state of Minas Gerais, Brazil